Peter Varellas (born October 2, 1984) is an American water polo player who grew up in Moraga, CA and attended Campolindo High School. As a high school water polo player, Peter also swam for the year-round club Orinda Aquatics.  He was a member of the United States men's national water polo team at the 2008 Beijing Olympics. In the championship game, the USA team won the silver medal, defeated by Hungary.

Varellas played college water polo at Stanford University.

See also
 List of Olympic medalists in water polo (men)

References

External links
 

1984 births
Living people
American male water polo players
Water polo drivers
Stanford Cardinal men's water polo players
Left-handed water polo players
Water polo players at the 2008 Summer Olympics
Water polo players at the 2012 Summer Olympics
Olympic silver medalists for the United States in water polo
Medalists at the 2008 Summer Olympics
Pan American Games medalists in water polo
Pan American Games gold medalists for the United States
Water polo players at the 2011 Pan American Games
People from Moraga, California
Medalists at the 2011 Pan American Games